Leon Jakimič (born February 23, 1975) is a Czech entrepreneur, founder and owner of glassmaking company Lasvit.

Life and career
Leon Jakimič was born in Liberec, Bohemia in 1975. He received a tennis scholarship in California at Loyola Marymount University in Los Angeles, where he studied Economics. He graduated from the Kellogg-HKUST Executive MBA Program in 2005. In 2007 he founded Lasvit, company designing and manufacturing bespoke light fittings, feature glass installations, and lighting collections. Recently he lives in Hong Kong.

See also
 Bohemian glass

References

External links
 

1975 births
Czech businesspeople
Czech people of Russian descent
Loyola Marymount University alumni
Living people